Weng Yu-yi (born 29 March 1973) is a Taiwanese former cyclist. He competed in the three events at the 1992 Summer Olympics.

References

1973 births
Living people
Taiwanese male cyclists
Olympic cyclists of Taiwan
Cyclists at the 1992 Summer Olympics
Place of birth missing (living people)
Cyclists at the 1994 Asian Games
Asian Games competitors for Chinese Taipei